Edwarda O'Bara (March 27, 1953November 21, 2012) was an American woman who spent 42 years in a diabetic coma starting in January 1970 after contracting pneumonia in December 1969.

Biography

Family 
O'Bara was born in Johnstown, Pennsylvania to Joe O'Bara and Kathryn McCloskey. She was named after Kaye's father Edward McCloskey, a mayor of the latter town during the 1930s. Joe was a halfback at the University of Pittsburgh in 1952, was the Middleweight Boxing champion for the U.S. Navy during World War II, and went on to become a physical education teacher, Kaye was a high school math teacher. She also had a younger sister, Colleen.

Illness and care 
O'Bara contracted pneumonia on December 20, 1969, at 16 years old.  Her condition worsened over a period of two weeks and she was taken to a hospital.  According to her family, at 3 a.m. on January 3, 1970, O'Bara "woke up shaking and in great pain because the oral form of insulin she had been taking wasn't reaching her blood stream". The date was significant for the family as it was her parents' 22nd wedding anniversary. Her family rushed her to the hospital, where she slipped into a diabetic coma. Before losing consciousness, Edwarda asked her mother, Kaye O'Bara, to never leave her side. She later slipped into a diabetic coma. She was fed from a tube and her mother Kaye turned her from side to side every two hours to prevent bedsores. Kaye also read, played music and made conversation with her. Her father Joe also gave up his job to care for her.  By 2007, the costs of O'Bara's care had put her mother into debt by $200,000. Her father, Joe, had a heart attack in 1972 and died in 1976, at the age of 50. Her mother, Kaye, died in 2008, at the age of 81. After their mother's death, Edwarda continued to be cared for by her sister.

Death 
O'Bara died at her home in Miami Gardens, Florida on November 21, 2012, at the age of 59. In the aftermath, thousands of people from around the world pilgrimaged to the O'Bara family home.

References

External links 
Official website

1953 births
2012 deaths
Miami Norland Senior High School alumni
People from Johnstown, Pennsylvania
People from Miami
People with disorders of consciousness
People with severe brain damage
People with hypoxic and ischemic brain injuries